The  was an infantry division of the Imperial Japanese Army. It was formed 10 July 1944 in Xinxiang as a type-C(hei) security division, simultaneously with the 114th, 115th and 118th divisions. The nucleus for the formation was the 14th Independent Infantry Brigade. The division was initially assigned to the Twelfth Army.

Action
Although slated for the Battle of West Henan–North Hubei, the 117th division was reassigned to the 44th army and sent to Taonan in April 1945. During the Soviet invasion of Manchuria, the 117th division was tasked with the defense of Liaoyuan and has surrendered to Red Army in Gongzhuling. The last soldiers were returned to Japan only in 1963.

See also
 List of Japanese Infantry Divisions

Notes and references
This article incorporates material from Japanese Wikipedia page 第117師団 (日本軍), accessed 27 June 2016
 Madej, W. Victor, Japanese Armed Forces Order of Battle, 1937–1945 [2 vols], Allentown, PA: 1981.

Japanese World War II divisions
Infantry divisions of Japan
Military units and formations established in 1944
Military units and formations disestablished in 1945
1944 establishments in Japan
1945 disestablishments in Japan